Mirnawati Hardjolukito (born 8 September 1953) is an Indonesian diver. She competed in the women's 3 metre springboard event at the 1972 Summer Olympics.

References

External links
 

1953 births
Living people
Indonesian female divers
Olympic divers of Indonesia
Divers at the 1972 Summer Olympics
Place of birth missing (living people)
Asian Games medalists in diving
Divers at the 1970 Asian Games
Asian Games bronze medalists for Indonesia
Medalists at the 1970 Asian Games
20th-century Indonesian women